Donald Charles Cunnell (19 October 1893 – 12 July 1917) was a British First World War flying ace who was killed in action over Belgium. He is known for having shot down and wounded the Red Baron, Manfred von Richthofen.

Early life
Cunnell was born on 19 October 1893 at Norwich, Norfolk, England, the son of Charles Donald Cunnell and educated at Gresham's School, Holt. He trained as an architect and served for two years in the Norfolk Officer Training Corps.

Military career
In September 1914, Cunnell enlisted as a private, and soon was promoted to sergeant. On 2 November 1915, he was commissioned as a second lieutenant into the Hampshire Regiment, and saw active service on the Western Front. On 24 November 1916 he was seconded for duty with the Royal Flying Corps, and appointed a temporary flying officer.

On 1 March 1917 he was promoted to lieutenant. On 14 May 1917 Cunnell was appointed a flight commander with the temporary rank of captain. Between 2 May and 11 July, Cunnell claimed nine victories (five claimed destroyed, four "out of control") flying a FE2d with No 20 Squadron.

On 6 July 1917, Cunnell, flying with Second Lieutenant Albert Edward Woodbridge was part of a patrol of six aircraft attacked by a flight of German Albatros D.Vs including one flown by Manfred von Richthofen. During the clash Richthofen was wounded in the head and forced to land near Wervicq. The victory was credited to the crew of Cunnell's A6412.

It is often falsely stated that this was the only time Richthofen was shot down in air-to-air combat, overlooking Edwin Benbow's victory over the Red Baron on 6 March 1917. However, this was the only time the Red Baron was wounded in action.

Woodbridge later described the action:

Richthofen's subsequent medical treatment disclosed that the bullet that hit him may have come from behind. Despite Cunnell and Woodbridge's confirmed claim for this aerial victory, Richthofen may have fallen from fire from one of the other FE.2s of 20 Squadron, from being shot down by Raymond Collishaw, or even from one of Collishaw's wingmen from 'B' Flight, 10 Naval Squadron such as William Melville Alexander, Ellis Vair Reid, or Desmond Fitzgibbon.

Cunnell was killed by German anti-aircraft fire a few days later on 12 July 1917, near Wervicq, Belgium; his observer, Lt. A. G. Bill, successfully flew his fighter back to base. He was buried at the Bailleul Communal Cemetery Extension North at Bailleul, France, close to the Belgian border, in grave number III.C.263.

War record
Aerial victories:

References

Bibliography

1893 births
1917 deaths
Military personnel from Norwich
People educated at Gresham's School
Royal Hampshire Regiment officers
Royal Flying Corps officers
English aviators
British Army personnel of World War I
British military personnel killed in World War I
British World War I flying aces
Aviators killed by being shot down